Kabuki is a form of traditional Japanese theater.

Kabuki may also refer to:

People and characters

Akihisa Mera (born 1948), a Japanese professional wrestler best known as The Great Kabuki
The Kabuki Warriors, a Japanese professional wrestling women's tag team made up of Asuka (wrestler) and Kairi Sane

Kamen Rider Kabuki, a character from Kamen Rider Hibiki
Kabuki, a character from the David Mack comic book Kabuki

Literature

Kabuki (David W. Mack comic), a comic book series by artist and writer David Mack
Kabuki (manga), a manga by Yukari Hashida

Other uses
Kabuki dance, a term used by American political pundits as a synonym for political posturing
Kabuki brush, a make-up brush
"Kabuki", a song from the album Adult by Tokyo Jihen

See also

Kabuki syndrome, a rare genetic disorder characterised by facial dysmorphism